The humite group is a group of nesosilicates with the general formula .  

When A is predominantly magnesium we have the humite subgroup:
norbergite, 
chondrodite, 
humite, 
clinohumite, 

The manganese-humite subgroup has members 
alleghanyite, 
manganhumite, 
sonolite, 

and the leucophoenicite subgroup has members
ribbeite, 
leucophoenicite, 
jerrygibbsite 

Chondrodite is the most common member of the humite group.  It may contain Ti up to 9.6% .  Chondrodite from Sterling Hill Mine and Franklin Mine contains zinc to 11.5% ZnO and Mn to 36% MnO, and grades to alleghanyite.

The humite minerals commonly alter to serpentine or Mg-rich chlorite and dissolve by weathering, leaving iron oxide residues.

References